is a former Japanese football player.

Career
On 7 March 2012, it was announced that he had signed a two-year contract with Estonian Meistriliiga side JK Nõmme Kalju. Takeda made the league debut for the club on 10 March 2012, in a goalless draw against city rivals FC Levadia Tallinn. On 19 June 2012, he scored four goals in a 17–0 cup win over amateurs SK Eestimaa Kasakad. The contract was mutually terminated on 24 July and the player rejoined his previous club FB Gulbene in the Latvian Higher League. Gulbene were relegated from the Latvian Higher League after the 2012 season, and Takeda joined FC Jūrmala in February 2013. He played 12 matches for Jūrmala, scoring no goals and left the club in July 2013.

Club statistics

References

External links
 
 J-League
 

1985 births
Living people
Ryutsu Keizai University alumni
Association football people from Saitama Prefecture
Japanese footballers
J2 League players
Japan Football League players
USL League Two players
Fagiano Okayama players
Matsumoto Yamaga FC players
Indiana Invaders players
FB Gulbene players
Nõmme Kalju FC players
FC Jūrmala players
Japanese expatriate footballers
Expatriate footballers in Latvia
Japanese expatriate sportspeople in Latvia
Association football forwards
Expatriate footballers in Estonia
Japanese expatriate sportspeople in Estonia
Meistriliiga players